Agabus adpressus is a species of beetle belonging to the family Dytiscidae. In North America this species has been found in Alaska, the Northwest Territories, and Southampton Island. It also ranges from northern Scandinavia to eastern Siberia and Mongolia. This species lives in running water or lake shores. It can usually be found under stones near the water's edge, but sometimes inhabits sedge roots or overhanging vegetation on undercut river banks.

References

Beetles of North America
Beetles of Europe
Insects of Mongolia
adpressus
Beetles described in 1837
Taxa named by Charles Nicholas Aubé